X-Quisite was an R&B Canadian girl group. The trio made up of Nicole Holness, Melanie Fiona Hallim, Andreena Mill and later in 2003 new member, Nirvana Savoury was signed to Linus Entertainment (Then distributed by Warner Music Canada) soon after the group was established in 2002. The group released their self-titled debut studio album X-Quisite in 2003. In 2004, the album earned the group a Juno Award nomination for "R&B/Soul Recording of the Year". The group had a number of singles from their debut album, most notably "Bad Girl", "No Regrets" and "Sassy Thang". The group disbanded in 2005, with all three members moving on to pursue solo music careers.

After break-up

Nicole Holness

Nicole Holness (born April 13, 1984, in Toronto, Ontario) became a television host as one of the original seven co-hosts of MTV Canada and their flagship series MTV Live. On March 1, 2011, she released her debut solo album Unreleased. The album was preceded by her debut single, "Epic" (May 5, 2009) and "Pop Yo Bottles" (June 29, 2010). She has also been a model in several Canadian national print advertisement campaigns.

Melanie Fiona Hallim

Melanie Fiona Hallim (born July 4, 1983, in Toronto, Ontario) with Guyanese immigrant parents, of mixed African, Indian, and Portuguese descent. followed a very lucrative musical career. After a brief period in another group called The Renaissance with rapper Drake, and recorded a reggae song "Somebody Come Get Me" under the stage name Syren Hall. The song was included in the Reggae Gold 2008 compilation album.

She went solo with her debut album The Bridge released in 2009, having collaborated with Future Cut, Vada Nobles, Stereotypes, J. Phoenix and Peter Wade Keusch. The debut single "Give It to Me Right" (February 28, 2009) was a hit on Canadian Hot 100 chart and reached number 41 on the UK Singles Chart. The second single, "It Kills Me", became her breakout song on the Billboard Hot 100 where it entered the Top 50, along with topping the Hot R&B/Hip-Hop Songs chart. The song earned her a Grammy Award nomination for Best Female R&B Vocal Performance. The song "Monday Morning" is her biggest hit in Europe to date. The Bridge also earned her a NAACP Image Award nomination for Outstanding New Artist. In 2012, Hallim won two Grammy Awards for Best Traditional R&B Performance and Best R&B Song for the song "Fool for You" with Cee Lo Green. In 2011, Hallim began recording her second studio album The MF Life. She has co-written songs for recording artists Rihanna and Kardinal Offishall, working with, amongst others, super producer Mike City.

Andreena Mill
Mill has released several solo singles, and has worked as a backing or guest vocalist for R&B and hip hop artists, including Drake, DMX, Saukrates, Tre Mission, Aaron A, Jazzfeezy, Tone Mason and Kardinal Offishall. Andreena Mill is a singer who has collaborated with Drake. Her father, also a musician and recording artist, realized her musical potential at age 3 and enrolled her in piano lessons the next year. By the age of 11, Andreena began recording and writing her own material.

As Andreena began high school in 2001, her life would drastically change, as she became a member of popular Canadian female trio X-Quisite, alongside MTV Canada host, Nicole Holness and Melanie Fiona (Universal Motown).

In 2002, the group reached notoriety with the release of two successful singles “No Regrets”, which was followed by “Don’t Say”. The songs landed the group Canadian Urban Music Awards and Juno Award Nominations in 2003. The singles achieved domestic success, while giving the girls a taste of fame.

In 2004, Andreena decided to pursue her own solo career, and signed a publishing deal with Universal Music Publishing New York in late 2010.

Today, the high energy, intense styling of Andreena's tracks and depth of writing provide the perfect ingredients for her musical magic, which she refers to as ‘Electric Rock’n Soul’.

Andreena lent her distinct and euphoric sound to rapper Drake for his critically acclaimed mixtape “Comeback Season”, which quickly became an international success. Andreena has also worked with artists such as The Bizness (Chris Brown, “No Bullshit”), Brian Michael Cox (Mary J. Blige, “Be Without You”), James Fauntleroy (Jordin Sparks, “No Air”), Kevin McCall (Keri Hilson, “One Night Stand”, Chris Brown “Deuces”) and Needlz (Bruno Mars, “Just The Way You Are”) to name a few.

As Andreena gears up for her Fall 2011 debut album release “All Eyes On Me”, she still finds time to write for artists – “I keep it simple, I love what I do and do what I love, it never feels like work”. For the immediate future, it seems all eyes will be on Andreena Mill.

Nirvana Savoury
Nirvana Savoury quit music for a while after her brother died in 2008. He had been suffering for many years of Ataxia telangiectasia. She also came out some time later as a lesbian. She has made a comeback in the 2010s, with release of a single "Lipstick Lover" in 2011 in addition to a dance mixtape version with Jester and Kid Kut from Toronto. The mixtape also contains three original tracks, "Ambulance", "Flavors" and "Throb". Savoury also appeared in Karl Wolf's 2012 album Finally Free with the track "Tell Me" featuring Nirvana Savoury. She is working on a solo album for release in 2013.

Discography

Albums
2003: X-Quisite
Track list
"Colors" (1:00)
"Sassy Thang" (4:10)
"Bad Girl" (3:36)
"Don't Say" (2:58)
"No Regrets" (3:22)
"How We Swing"  (3:31)
"Best Friends"  (3:47)
"Who's the Man" (3:32)
"Showing Love" (4:20)
"Why You Do" (3:42)
"Ex-Girlfriend" (3:13)
"Foolio" (1:13)
"Through the Week" (5:21)
"Bad Girl" 
"No Regrets"  (4:30) 
"Don't Say"  (2:57)
"No Regrets"  (3:26)

Singles

"No Regrets"(2002)
”Bad Girl” (2003)
"Sassy Thang" (2004)

References

External links
 X-Quisite at Last.fm

Black Canadian musical groups
Canadian contemporary R&B musical groups
Canadian girl groups
Musical groups from Toronto
Musical groups established in 2002
2002 establishments in Ontario